The following are the football (soccer) events of the year 1942 throughout the world.

Winners club national championship 
 Argentina: River Plate
 Austria: Vienna
 Chile: Santiago Morning
 Costa Rica: CS La Libertad
 Croatia: Concordia Zagreb
 Germany: FC Schalke 04
 Italy: A.S. Roma
 Mexico: Spain (Mexican football team)
 Netherlands: ADO Den Haag
 Scotland:
Scottish Cup: No competition
 Spain: Valencia C.F.
 Switzerland: Grasshoppers
 Turkey: Harb Okulu
 Uruguay: Nacional

Births 
 January 25: Eusébio, Portuguese international footballer (died 2014)
 February 27: Klaus-Dieter Sieloff, German international footballer (died 2011)
 February 28: Dino Zoff, Italian international footballer and coach
 April 19: Javier Fragoso, Mexican international footballer (died 2014)
 May 18: Nobby Stiles, English international footballer (died 2020)
 July 5: Hannes Löhr, German international footballer and coach (died 2016)
 July 18: Giacinto Facchetti, Italian international footballer (died 2006)
 August 2: Ilija Pantelić, Serbian Yugoslav international footballer (died 2014)
 August 7: Sigfried Held, German international footballer and coach
 October 1: Constantin Frățilă, Romanian international footballer (died 2016)
 October 3: Roberto Perfumo, Argentine international footballer (died 2016)
 December 3: Pedro Rocha, Uruguayan international footballer and manager (died 2013)

References

 
Association football by year